Blood and Steel is a 1925 American silent Western film directed by J.P. McGowan and starring Helen Holmes, William Desmond and Robert Edeson.

Synopsis
A railroad president constructing a line in the West heads out to investigate the delays that have plagued the project. He becomes aware that his own assistant is working in league with a rival company to obstruct the new railroad.

Cast
 Helen Holmes as Helen Grimshaw
 William Desmond as Gordon Steele
 Robert Edeson as W.L. Grimshaw
 Mack V. Wright as Devore Palmer
 Albert J. Smith as Jurgin
 Ruth Stonehouse as Vera
 C.L. Sherwood as The Cook
 Bill Cody as Tommy 
 Walter Fitzroy as Mr. Steele

References

Bibliography
 Connelly, Robert B. The Silents: Silent Feature Films, 1910-36, Volume 40, Issue 2. December Press, 1998.
 Munden, Kenneth White. The American Film Institute Catalog of Motion Pictures Produced in the United States, Part 1. University of California Press, 1997.

External links
 

1925 films
1925 Western (genre) films
1920s English-language films
American silent feature films
Silent American Western (genre) films
American black-and-white films
Films directed by J. P. McGowan
Films with screenplays by George H. Plympton
Rail transport films
1920s American films